St Cyprian's Church is an episcopal church in Beech road, Lenzie, East Dunbartonshire, Scotland.  It was built in 1873 by Alexander Ross of Inverness and cost around £2600. The Church has been a category B listed building since 1984.

In October 2010 the church held a pet blessing service which was the first of its kind in East Dunbartonshire, the pet service has since become an annual event.

Rectors
Rev. Francis Patrick Flemyng, LL.D. 1872 to 1874 
Rev. Lionel William.Stanton, B.A. 1874 to 1876 
Rev. Henry Williams Kirby 1876 to 1911
Rev. James Caughey Wilson 1912 to 1915 
Rev. Canon William Collins 1915 to 1954
Rev. Canon Thomas Kindon Kay 1955 to 1965
Rev. Douglas Wyndham Haling Grant, M.A 1965 to 1969
Rev. Joseph Roderick McLellan, B.D. 1970 to 1978
Rev. Harry Keith Tredgill 1978 to 1986
Rev. John Edward Scott 1986 to 1989
Rev. Kenneth James Shaw 1990 to ?
Rev. John Marsburg ? to 2005
Rev. Geoff Scobie 2006 to 2009
Rev. Les Ireland 2012 to present

References

External links

http://www.stcyprianslenzie.com/

Lenzie
Episcopal church buildings in Scotland
Churches completed in 1873
Category B listed buildings in East Dunbartonshire
Listed churches in Scotland